Antenatal perineal massage (APM) or Birth Canal Widening (BCW) is the massage (painless stretching) of a pregnant woman's perineum – the skin and deep tissues around the opening to the vagina or ('birth canal' – when a baby is in this passage), performed in the 4 to 6 weeks before childbirth, i.e., 34 weeks onwards and continued weekly until birth. The practice aims to gently mimic the 'massaging' action of a baby's head on the opening to the birth canal (vagina) prior to birth, so works with nature, to achieve the 10cm diameter opening without using the back of baby's head, i.e., doing some of the hard work of labour (birth) before the start of labour, making birth less stressful on the baby and mother. The intention is also to attempt to: eliminate the need for an episiotomy during an instrument (forceps and vacuum extraction) delivery; to prevent tearing of the perineum during birth and in this way avoid infection (cellulitis and necrotising fasciitis), helping to keep antibiotics working into the future. This technique uses Plastic Surgeons 'skin tissue expansion' principle, to aid a natural birth.

Description
The Oxford Radcliffe NHS Trust Document "Antenatal Perineal Massage" 2011 describes the use of the pregnant mother's thumbs being placed just inside the birth canal, whilst she stands with one foot supported on the toilet. She pulls backwards towards her spine, whilst relaxing her pelvic floor, progressively increasing the pressure under her finger tips until this starts to feel uncomfortable. On the next occasion she uses both thumbs pulling backwards and then sideways, thumbs away from each other, to enlarge the 2 cm diameter opening of the birth canal progressively over time to 10 cm by progressing to use the four fingers of both hands pulling away from each other, painlessly, to avoid causing tearing.  It is not possible to stretch this opening further, because this will be limited by the distance between the bony walls of the pelvis.

If preferred by the mother, a trusted partner can also perform the massage thus avoiding the need for the mother to be standing up and exerting herself. The mother can sit on a floor or in bed with knees bent and slightly apart, and, after applying oil or lubricant, the partner can perform the massage by inserting initially two fingers, pressing down towards the perineum (in the direction of the anus) as far as the pressure is comfortable for the mother. Once this point of maximum pressure is found, hold the position for 30 seconds. Repeat daily, gradually inserting more fingers until able to stretch to 10 cm.

Purposes
The goal of APM is to both prevent the baby's head from undergoing excessive strain during the last 30 minutes of labour, by training the mother to relax her pelvic floor to allow the baby's head to pass through the opening and also to prevent excessive blood loss in the mother (Post Partum Haemorrhage), as haemorrhage in childbirth is one of the five leading causes of deaths of mothers in childbirth so called Maternal deaths by enabling the mother to completely avoid an episiotomy. The pelvic floor muscle has a very good blood supply and the blood loss caused by an episiotomy, contributes to the blood loss, which occurs when the placenta separates from the wall of the uterus, tipping mothers, who have a prolonged labour, into shock. APM prevents a prolonged labour by stretching the two fibrous layers within the Uro-Genital Membrane, a triangular shaped muscular shelf at the front half of the opening of the bony pelvis, through which the 2 cm diameter birth canal and urethra pass, and the fibrous coats of the pelvic floor muscles, in this way shortening the pushing stage of birth, and transforms the fat packed rigid skin at the opening to the birth canal into paper thin, stretchy elastic skin, all without using the baby's head, decreasing the risk of tearing.  
 
If the external skin (perineal skin) opening is stretched before birth, to 10 cm. diameter, the maximal opening in the bony pelvis (pelvic outlet), then there is no reason to perform an episiotomy,as an episiotomy will not increase the diameter of the opening of the birth canal any further i.e. 10 cm. makes episiotomy obsolete. Tearing is less likely as the external skin at the opening has already been stretched and is lax, whilst the underlying muscular pelvic floor has not been damaged, but made more elastic. Episiotomy permanently damages the pelvic floor muscle, as the episiotomy cuts through both the nerve and the arterial blood supply to this muscle, so the larger part of the pelvic floor muscles atrophies and becomes replaced by scar tissue, increasing the mother's chance of developing a prolapse in the future. Antenatal (before birth from 'Anteroir'- meaning before and 'Natal' Latin derived from Nativity meaning birth) Perineal Massage does not damage the pelvic floor, and so protects against a prolapse of the urinary bladder, through the front wall of the vagina, and the rectum, through the back wall of the vagina, and the uterus through the upper part of the vagina.

History
Antenatal perineal massage or pre-birth obstetric massage (birth canal widening) was reportedly used by African tribal people. The German obstetrician Mr Welheim Horkel, when visiting a medical mission in the mid-1980s, learned that African tribes used gourds of increasing sizes to stretch the perineum, to avoid tearing during childbirth. He replicated this in a hospital setting using an inflatable silicone balloon naming the device 'Epi-no Delphine Plus, from 'Episiotomy -NO!'. The Czech have produced an improvement on 'Epi-on Delphine Plus' naming their device 'Aniball'.

West Berkshire England performed an antenatal massage trial in 1984, and many small trials have been performed worldwide since. Cochrane Collaborate Reports since 2006 have advised that women should be informed that episiotomy is avoidable if they employ digital antenatal perineal massage.

Effectiveness

A recent meta-analysis involving 11 randomized clinical trials and more than 3,000 patients in total clearly demonstrated that antenatal perineal massage is associated with a lower risk of severe perineal trauma and postpartum complications. Women who received antenatal perineal massage had significantly lower incidence of episiotomies (RR = 0.79, 95% CI [0.72, 0.87], p < 0.001) and perineal tears (RR = 0.79, 95% CI [0.67, 0.94], p = 0.007), particularly the risk of third- and fourth-degree perineal tears (p = 0.03). Better wound healing and less perineal pain were evident in the antenatal perineal massage group. Antenatal perineal massage reduced the second stage of labor duration (p = 0.005) and anal incontinence (p = 0.003) with significant improvement in baby's Apgar scores at 1 and 5 minutes (p = 0.01 and p = 0.02).

Finger tip 'Antenatal Perineal Massage' or 'Birth Canal Widening' to 10 cm diameter, affords mothers worldwide, irrespective of income, the opportunity to shorten the critical last 30 minutes of labour and improve APGAR score of baby at birth. Mothers with a narrowed opening in their bony pelvis, whether from being born with an abnormally narrow pelvis, from previous fracture or from deformity secondary to infection in the bone (osteomyelitis) or very large baby because of gestational diabetes during the pregnancy, or with conjoint twins, may need surgical intervention, as indicated by a failure to progress either when the baby's head fails to enter the bony pelvis or develops fetal distress.
For mothers who struggle, near term i.e. 38 weeks to reach, birth facilitating devices Aniball and Epi-no Delphine Plus exits.

References

See also 

 Kegel exercises
 Birthing chair
 Sheehan's syndrome

Obstetrics
Childbirth
Massage
Midwifery